Rosemere High School (RHS) of the Sir Wilfrid Laurier School Board is a high school located in the town of Rosemère, Québec, Canada. It is housed in a two-story structure with enrollment of approximately 1,200 students.

The building is adjacent to the board headquarters. The school campus itself houses the board's Educational Services and Complementary Services Centre.

Rosemere High School students were required to follow a specific dress code for both magistral and physical education classes. However, this dress code was removed in the 2018 school year. A dress code for physical education is loosely enforced.

Attendance zones

In the north: Blainville, Sainte-Anne-des-Plaines, La Plaine, Mascouche, and Terrebonne.
In the south: Rivière des Mille Îles.
In the west: Boisbriand and Mirabel: Domaine Vert.
In the east: Repentigny and Le Gardeur.

School sports
There are currently 11 sport programs at RHS:
 Basketball
 Junior; Boys
 Senior; Boys - Raiders
 Senior; Girls - Tropix
 Football: Rosemere Raiders
 Junior; Boys
 Senior; Boys
Hockey
 Junior; Boys
 Senior; Boys - Mustangs
 Soccer
 Junior; Boys
 Junior; Girls - Strikers
 Senior; Boys
 Senior; Girls
 Jungball
 Junior; Boys
 Superthrow
 Junior; Boys
Extreme Bike Riding
Junior; boys - Rosemere Riderz
Senior; boys - Bike Boyz of Rosemere

References

External links
 Sir Wilfrid Laurier School Board
 Rosemere High School official website

High schools in Quebec
English-language schools in Quebec
Schools in Laurentides
Educational institutions established in 1966
1966 establishments in Quebec